The Roxby Formation, previously known as the Permian Upper Marls, is a formation from the Guadalupian-Early Triassic of eastern England (formation dies out at Nottinghamshire). The formation is made up largely of mudstone and siltstone, reddish brown, with subordinate sandstone.

References 

Geologic formations of England